Eylau can refer to:
Battle of Eylau during the Napoleonic Wars in 1807
Bagrationovsk (Preußisch Eylau) in Russia, until 1945 in East Prussia, Germany
Eylau, Texas
Iława (Deutsch Eylau) in Poland, until 1945 in West Prussia, Germany
French ship Eylau (1856)